Wallacea  is a biogeographical designation for a group of mainly Indonesian islands separated by deep-water straits from the Asian and Australian continental shelves. Wallacea includes Sulawesi, the largest island in the group, as well as Lombok, Sumbawa, Flores, Sumba, Timor, Halmahera, Buru, Seram, and many smaller islands. The islands of Wallacea lie between the Sunda Shelf (the Malay Peninsula, Sumatra, Borneo, Java, and Bali) to the west, and the Sahul Shelf including Australia and New Guinea to the south and east.

Geography
Wallacea is defined as the series of islands stretching between the two continental shelves of Sunda and Sahul, but excluding the Philippines. Its eastern border (separating Wallacea from Sahul) is represented by a zoogeographical boundary known as Lydekker's Line, while the Wallace Line (separating Wallacea from Sunda) defines its western border. 

The Weber Line is the midpoint, at which Asian and Australian fauna and flora are approximately equally represented. It follows the deepest straits traversing the Indonesian Archipelago.

The Wallace Line is named after the Welsh naturalist Alfred Russel Wallace, who recorded the differences between mammal and bird fauna between the islands on either side of the line. The islands of Sundaland to the west of the line, including Sumatra, Java, Bali, and Borneo, share a mammal fauna similar to that of East Asia, which includes tigers, rhinoceros, and apes; whereas the mammal fauna of Lombok and areas extending eastwards are mostly populated by marsupials and birds similar to those in Australasia. Sulawesi shows signs of both.

During the ice ages, sea levels were lower, exposing the Sunda shelf that links the islands of Sundaland to one another and to Asia and allowing Asian land animals to inhabit these islands. 

The islands of Wallacea have few land mammals, land birds, or freshwater fish of continental origin, which find it difficult to cross open ocean. Many species of birds, reptiles, and insects were better able to cross the straits, and many such species of Australian and Asian origin are found there. Wallacea's plants are predominantly of Asian origin, and botanists include Sundaland, Wallacea, and New Guinea as the floristic province of Malesia.

Similarly, Australia and New Guinea to the east are linked by a shallow continental shelf, and were linked by a land bridge during the ice ages, forming a single continent that scientists variously call Australia-New Guinea, Meganesia, Papualand, or Sahul. Consequently, Australia, New Guinea, and the Aru Islands share many marsupial mammals, land birds, and freshwater fish that are not found in Wallacea.

Biota and conservation issues

Although the distant ancestors of Wallacea's flora and fauna may have been from Asia or Australia-New Guinea, Wallacea is home to many endemic species. There is extensive autochthonous speciation and proportionately large numbers of endemics; it is an important contributor to the overall mega-biodiversity of the Indonesian Archipelago.

Fauna species include the endemic anoa (dwarf buffalo) of Sulawesi and the babirusa (deer pig). Maluku shows a degree of species similarity with Sulawesi, but with fewer flora and fauna. Smaller mammals including primates are common. Seram Island is noted for its butterflies and birdlife including the Moluccan king parrot.

Wallacea was originally almost completely forested, mostly tropical moist broadleaf forests, with some areas of tropical dry broadleaf forest. The higher mountains are home to montane and subalpine forests, and mangroves are common in coastal areas. According to Conservation International, Wallacea is home to over 10,000 plant species, of which approximately 1,500 (15%) are endemic.

Endemism is higher among terrestrial vertebrate species; of 1,142 species found there, almost half (529) are endemic. 45%  of the region retains some sort of forest cover, and only 52,017 km2, or 15 percent, is in a pristine state. Of Wallacea's total area of 347,000 km2, about 20,000 km2 are protected.

Wallacea is home to 82 threatened and six critically endangered species of terrestrial vertebrates.

Ecoregions
Tropical and subtropical moist broadleaf forests:

Banda Sea Islands moist deciduous forests (Kai Islands, Tanimbar Islands, Babar Islands, Leti Islands, eastern Barat Daya Islands)
Buru rain forests (Buru)
Halmahera rain forests (Halmahera, Morotai, Obi Islands, Bacan Island)
Seram rain forests (Seram, Banda Islands, Ambon Island, Saparua, Gorong archipelago)
Sulawesi lowland rain forests (Sulawesi, Banggai Islands, Sula Islands, Sangihe Islands, Talaud Islands)
Sulawesi montane rain forests (Sulawesi)

Tropical and subtropical dry broadleaf forests:

Lesser Sundas deciduous forests (Lombok, Sumbawa, Komodo, Flores, Alor)
Sumba deciduous forests (Sumba)
Timor and Wetar deciduous forests (Timor, Wetar)

Distribution between Asia and Australia
Australia may be isolated by sea, but technically through Wallacea, it can be zoologically extended. Australian Early-Middle Pliocene rodent fossils have been found in Chinchilla Sands and Bluffs Down in Queensland, but a mix of ancestral and derived traits suggest murid rodents made it to Australia earlier, maybe in the Miocene, over a forested archipelago, i.e. Wallacea, and evolved in Australia in isolation. 

Australia's rodents make up much of the continent's placental mammal fauna and include various species from stick-nest rats to hopping mice. Other mammals invaded from the east. Two species of cuscus, the Sulawesi bear cuscus and the Sulawesi dwarf cuscus, are the westernmost representatives of the Australasian marsupials.

The tectonic uplift of Wallacea during the collision between Australia and Asia  23 million years ago allowed the global dispersal of passerine birds from Australia across the Indonesian islands. Bustards and megapodes must have somehow colonized Australia. Cockatiels similar to those from Australia inhabit Komodo Island in Wallacea.

A few species of Eucalyptus, a predominant genus of trees in Australia, are found in Wallacea: Eucalyptus deglupta on Sulawesi, and E. urophylla and E. alba in East Nusa Tenggara. For land snails Wallacea and Wallace's Line do not form a barrier for dispersal.

References

External links

 Conservation International: Wallacea
 Too Many Lines; The Limits of the Oriental and Australian Zoogeographic Regions George Gaylord Simpson, Proceedings of the American Philosophical Society, Vol. 121, No. 2 (Apr. 29, 1977), pp. 107–120
 Wallacea Research Group

 
Regions of Southeast Asia
Biogeography
Indomalayan realm
Australasian realm
Ecoregions of Asia
Maritime Southeast Asia